Vitaliy Ivanovych Sobko (born 27 July 1987) is a Ukrainian football midfielder.

Club history
Vitaliy Sobko began his football career in Metalist Youth in Kharkiv. He transferred to FC Kremin Kremenchuk during 2009 winter transfer window.

Career statistics

Personal life
His older brother Aleksandr Sobko is also a footballer.

References

External links

  Profile – Official Kremin site
  FC Kremin Kremenchuk Squad on the PFL website
  Profile on the FFU website

1987 births
Living people
Footballers from Kharkiv
Association football midfielders
Ukrainian First League players
FC Helios Kharkiv players
FC Kremin Kremenchuk players
FC Hazovyk-KhGV Kharkiv players
FC Kramatorsk players
Ukrainian footballers